"Look at Me Now" is a song co-written and recorded by American country music artist Bryan White. It was released in December 1994 as the second single from the album Bryan White.  The song reached number 24 on the Billboard Hot Country Singles & Tracks chart.  White wrote the song with Derek George and John Tirro.

Music video
The music video was directed by Jeffrey C. Phillips and premiered in early 1995, It shows vignettes of Bryan White performing the song in a grand canyon in a daytime setting, and it shows a woman in the video, Meanwhile, the sunlight flashes on him.

Critical reception
Tom Lanham of New Country magazine said that the song was "stomping Eagles-ish celebration" and a "picture-perfect anthem".

Chart performance
"Look at Me Now" debuted at number 70 on the U.S. Billboard Hot Country Singles & Tracks for the week of December 24, 1994.

References

1995 singles
1994 songs
Bryan White songs
Songs written by Bryan White
Song recordings produced by Kyle Lehning
Song recordings produced by Billy Joe Walker Jr.
Asylum Records singles
Songs written by Derek George